Malawax, also malawah, is a sweet pancake that originated from Somalia. It is a type of pancake eaten regularly in Somalia, Djibouti, parts of Ethiopia and Kenya.

Overview 
Malawah is a plate sized sweet pancake that is perfect for breakfast or as snack anytime during the day. While there are slight variations in how Somalis make this pancake

While most Somalis call this pancake malawah, this name is also used by Yemeni and Jewish people for a different unrelated kind of flatbread called Malawach/Khubz mulawah.

References 

World cuisine
Somali cuisine
Somali
Cuisine by ethnicity